Chryseobacterium formosense is a bacterium. It is gram-negative, rod-shaped, non-spore forming and yellow-pigmented. Its type strain is  CC-H3-2T (CCUG 49271T, CIP 108367T). It was first isolated from the rhizosphere of a specimen of Lactuca sativa.

References

Further reading

Whitman, William B., et al., eds. Bergey's manual® of systematic bacteriology. Vol. 4 and 5. Springer, 2012.
Van Wyk, Esias Renier. Virulence Factors and Other Clinically Relevant Characteristics of Chryseobacterium Species. Diss. University of the Freee State, 2008.

External links 
LPSN

Type strain of Chryseobacterium formosense at BacDive -  the Bacterial Diversity Metadatabase

formosense
Bacteria described in 2004